The Caru River is a river of Maranhão state in northeastern Brazil.

See also
List of rivers of Maranhão

References
Brazilian Ministry of Transport

Rivers of Maranhão